Struggle Street is an Australian documentary series that first aired on SBS One on 6 May 2015. The second series began airing on 28 November 2017. The third series began airing on 9 October 2019.

Premise
The series sheds light on the struggles and aspirations of residents in public housing areas around Western Sydney; areas which have been commonly associated with high unemployment, drug use and problems with the law.

KEO Films, the production company behind the project stated on their website:

In this proposed 3-part observational documentary series, to be filmed over a 6-month period, we'll feature the voices and stories of people living on the outskirts of Sydney, in some of our most socially-disadvantaged communities.

We'll highlight the enormous challenges they face being born into generational disadvantage, and then being blamed by the system for their lack of progress.

...And rather than being an exercise in voyeurism, or a fleeting judgmental report, this extended insight into the lives of our subjects will - we hope - provoke not just a change in public perception, but a debate about the direction of public policy as well

Series overview

Reception
The series received strong criticism from local governments, with the Mayor of Blacktown, Stephen Bali labelling it as 'poverty porn'. Locals attempted to boycott the series by establishing a blockade of garbage trucks outside the SBS headquarters in Artarmon. The series aired as planned, winning its timeslot nationally and was the most watched program on television that night in Sydney, with the controversy claimed for the record ratings.

Western Sydney locals are contemplating legal action against the producers to seek damages for defamation.

SBS chief content officer Helen Kellie defended the program, stating that "We are confident that Struggle Street is a fair and accurate portrayal of events that occurred during filming...further, we believe the series fairly reflects the program description contained in participant release forms".

Several television critics and journalists viewed the show in a positive light, arguing that the outrage and controversy over the program was grossly overstated, and praised the show for bringing light to stories that otherwise wouldn't be told in the public domain.

Second Season
A second season of the show was filmed in Queensland and Victoria, and aired on 28 November 2017.

Ratings

Season One (2015)

Season Two (2017)

References

External links
 SBS Struggle Street

Special Broadcasting Service original programming
2010s Australian reality television series
Australian television docudramas
Television shows set in Sydney
Television controversies in Australia
2015 Australian television series debuts